Karelle Tremblay is a Canadian film and television actress from Quebec. Tremblay received a Canadian Screen Award nomination for Best Actress at the 4th Canadian Screen Awards in 2016 for Our Loved Ones (Les Êtres chers).

She has also appeared in the films Amsterdam, Corbo, King Dave, Oh What a Wonderful Feeling, The Fireflies Are Gone (La disparution des lucioles), Flashwood, You Will Remember Me (Tu te souviendras de moi) and Death of a Ladies' Man, and the television series Le Club des doigts croisés, 19-2 and Jérémie.

Tremblay was in a relationship with Franco-Ontarian comedienne Katherine Levac.

References

External links

Canadian film actresses
Canadian television actresses
Canadian child actresses
Actresses from Quebec
Living people
21st-century Canadian actresses
LGBT actresses
1996 births
Canadian LGBT actors
21st-century Canadian LGBT people